James West (born 21 February 1982) is an Australian journalist, and author.

Early life and education
West was born in Sydney and attended high school at Barker College, an independent school in Hornsby, a North Shore suburb of Sydney.  He is a graduate of the University of Sydney (Bachelor of Arts in Media and Communications) and New York University (Masters of Journalism).

Career
West has worked as a radio producer for the Australian Broadcasting Corporation in Sydney, in Beijing as a Foreign Expert at China Radio International where he was the inaugural producer of leading Australian podcast Mr Science Show, and as Producer of Triple J's national, daily current affairs program, Hack. He has also worked in television as a producer of the Insight program at SBS Television.

His memoir, Beijing Blur, was published by Penguin Books in Australia in June 2008. The book is an account of West's time in Beijing in 2005–06, particularly at China Radio International, and also includes chapters on capital punishment, Chinese punk rock music, blogging, and China's gay and lesbian culture. It is published in the US and Canada by Cuttyhunk/Landsdown Books, and in the UK by Crimson Publishing.

West gained international attention after posting a YouTube video asking to be invited to the Tran family Thanksgiving dinner in Florida, having received their personal emails for 3 years. The video, and subsequent journey from Sydney to Florida gained press attention in Australia and the US.

External links 
James West's blog
Beijing Blur on Amazon

References 

1982 births
Australian memoirists
ABC radio (Australia) journalists and presenters
New York University alumni
University of Sydney alumni
Writers from New South Wales
Living people
People educated at Barker College